Nanchang Greenland Central Plaza are two supertall skyscrapers in Nanchang, Jiangxi, China. Construction began in 2011 and ended in 2015.

See also
List of tallest buildings in China

References

Buildings and structures in Nanchang
Skyscrapers in Jiangxi